Gladiolus dalenii is a species of flowering plant in the iris family Iridaceae. It is one of the most widely distributed species of Gladiolus, ranging from eastern South Africa and Madagascar throughout tropical Africa and into western Arabia. It is the main parental species of the large flowering grandiflora hybrids. This species is also unusual in its genus in including diploid, tetraploid and hexaploid races. The hybrids produced from it are often tetraploids.

It produces five tall flower spikes of yellow to scarlet flowers, often streaked red over a yellow ground color, generally with a yellow throat. In cultivation, it prefers a light sandy neutral to slightly acid soil with a pH between 6.5 and 7 in a sunny sheltered position and requires a stony gritty loam.

References

External links
 

dalenii
Flora of West Tropical Africa
Flora of West-Central Tropical Africa
Flora of Northeast Tropical Africa
Flora of East Tropical Africa
Flora of South Tropical Africa
Flora of Southern Africa
Flora of the Western Indian Ocean
Flora of the Arabian Peninsula
Garden plants